This lists early editions of The Protocols of the Learned Elders of Zion, an antisemitic forgery purporting to describe a Jewish conspiracy to achieve world domination. For recent editions, see Contemporary imprints of The Protocols of the Elders of Zion.

In the Russian Empire
1902 M: Mikhail Osipovich Menshikov (1902) - The first textual reference to 
the Protocols, in a far-right newspaper article; claims that they were 
stolen by a "French journalist" in Nice, and quotes a line.

1903
In Russian, in the newspaper Znamya. The headline in the newspaper was Programa zavoevanija mira evrejami (The Jewish Programme to Conquer the World). The title of The Protocols (purported) itself was The Protocols of the Sessions of the "World Alliance of Freemasons and of the Sages of Zion". The publisher was Pavel Krushevan. Publication was in nine issues of the newspaper, from No. 190 through No. 197 and No. 200, from August to September (old style) or in September (new style).

1904 
L: Hippolytus Lutostansky  - A direct quote of above edition; no revision, but useful chronological evidence.

1905

Великое въ маломъ и антихристъ (Velikoe v' malom' i antikhrist' ), [The Great within the Minuscule and Antichrist, trans.]

kak blizkaia politicheskaia vozmozhnost. Zapiski pravoslavnago.
by Sergiei Nilus, 1862–1930.
Edition 	2. izd., ispr. i dop.
Imprint 	TSarskoe Selo, Tip. TSarskoselskago Komiteta Krasnago Kresta, 1905.
Description 	417 p.

1906

Vragi roda cheloviecheskago (romanized title)
(Title translation: Enemies of the Human Race)
Related name (anonymous editor): G. Butmi.
LC Uniform Title: Protocols of the wise men of Zion
(St. Petersberg: Soiuz russkogo naroda, 1906)
p. x, 88 24 cm.
LC Classification: DS141 .B97 1906
This version claims, bizarrely, that the Protocols date to 929 B.C.

1911
Library of Congress catalog card:
LC Control No.:	 75554498
Type of Material:	Book (Print, Microform, Electronic, etc.)
Personal Name:	Nilus, Sergeĭ Aleksandrovich, 1862-1930. [from old catalog]
Main Title:	Bliz gri͡adushchīĭ Antikhrĭst.
Published/Created:	1911.
Description:	168 p. illus. 23 cm.
Notes:	Romanized.
Subjects:	Antichrist. [from old catalog]
Russkaia pravoslavnaia tserkovʹ--Doctrinal and controversial works.
LC Classification:	BT985 .N54
Second Nilus Russian language edition

1912

1912 3rd ed. Serge Nilus imprint

1917

1917 4th ed. Serge Nilus imprint that was the source of the USA translations published in 1920.

In the United States

1919

Red "Bible" [1 of 2 in series]Public Ledger (Philadelphia) [Front Page, Continued on Page 10, Column 2]
October 27, 1919Reds Plot to Smash World and Then Rule with Universal Czar [2 of 2 in series]Public Ledger (Philadelphia) [Front Page, Continued on Page 12, Column 2]
October 28, 1919

1920.1

Library of Congress card catalog:
LC Control No.:	 83198259
Type of Material:	Book (Print, Microform, Electronic, etc.)
Uniform Title:	Protocols of the wise men of Zion.
Main Title:	The Protocols and world revolution [microform] : including a translation and analysis of the Protocols of the meetings of the Zionist men of wisdom.
Published/Created:	Boston : Small, Maynard & Co., c1920.
Related Names:	Nilus, Sergi͡eĭ, 1862-1930.
Description:	149 p.; 22 cm.
Notes:	"Based on a work by Sergi͡eĭ Nilus published in 1905 at Tsarskoje Selo"--Introd.
Call number of original: DS145.P5 1920.
Master microform held by: DLC.
Additional Formats:	Microfilm. Washington, D.C. : Library of Congress Photoduplication Service, 1983. 1 microfilm reel; 35 mm.
LC Classification:	Microfilm 83/612 (D)
 First American edition

1920.2

Library of Congress catalog card:
LC Control No.:	 21001311
Type of Material:	Book (Print, Microform, Electronic, etc.)
Uniform Title:	"Protocols of the wise men of Zion." [from old catalog] 
Main Title:	Præmonitus præmunitus.The protocols of the wise men of Zion,
tr. from the Russian to the English language for the information of all true Americans
& to confound enemies of democracy & the republic,
also to demonstrate the possible fulfillment of Biblical prophecy as to world domination by the Chosen people.
Published/Created:	New York, The Beckwith company, 1920.
Related Names:	Nilus, Serg-Y-Eief. [from old catalog]
Description:	2 p.l., iii-vii 165 p. front., 4 facsim. 21 cm.
Subjects:	Jews.
Communism. 
LC Classification:	DS145 .P5 1920a
Second American Edition

1920.3The International Jew: The World's Problem(The Dearborn Independent)1920–1922.4The International Jew: The World's Foremost Problem (Volume 1) (1920)Jewish Activities in the United States (Volume 2) (1921)Jewish Influence in American Life (Volume 3) (1921)Aspects of Jewish Power in the United States (Volume 4) (1922)

1934United We Fall, Divided We StandThe Protocols of the Meetings of the Learned Elders of ZionTranslated from the Russian by Victor E. Marsden
Formerly Russian Correspondent of "The Morning Post"
With Preface and Explanatory Notes.
(Chicago: The Patriotic Publishing Co., 1934)

In Britain

1920

Library of Congress card catalog:
LC Control No.:	21001691
Type of Material:	Book (Print, Microform, Electronic, etc.)
Uniform Title:	Protocols of the wise men of Zion.
Main Title:	The Jewish peril : protocols of the learned elders of Zion.
Edition Information:	Second edition.
Published/Created:	London : Published by "The Britons," 62 Oxford Street, 1920.
Related Names:	Nilus, Sergi͡eĭ, 1862-1930.
Britons. 
Description:	[2], vi, 96 p.; 22 cm.
Notes:	Translation of S. Nilus' book: Velikoe v malom [title romanized] published at Tsarkoye selo, 1905, in which the Protocols were published for the first time.
Subjects:	Antisemitism.
LC Classification:	DS145 .P5 1920c
Other System No.:	(OCoLC)13679570
Quality Code:	premarc
First British Edition, trans. George Shanks

1920.5The Cause of World UnrestRelated name: ed. & intro. Howell Arthur Gwynne
At the Library of Congress:
LC Control No.: 	 20019293
Type of Material: 	Book (Print, Microform, Electronic, etc.)
Main Title: 	The cause of world unrest; with an introduction by the editor of "The Morning post."
Published/Created: 	London, G. Richards, ltd., 1920.
Description: 	269, [1] p. 20 cm.
Notes: 	"The main outline of the contents of this book is, in brief,
that there has been for centuries a hidden conspiracy, chiefly Jewish,
whose objects have been and are to produce :revolution, communism and anarchy."--Pref.
Subjects: 	Freemasons.
Jewish question.
Communism.
LC Classification: 	DS141 .C25 1920
Other System No.: 	(OCoLC)4811891

1923Protocols of the meetings of the Learned Elders of Zion Author: Victor E. Marsden, Victor E. Marsden
Language: English
Place of publication: London
Publisher: The Britons
Year of publication: 1923Protocols of the Meetings of the Learned Elders of ZionTranslated from the Russian Text by Victor E. Marsden
(London: The Britons, 1923)
Singerman annotation: The Marsden translation has become the standard English Text.

1958World Conquest Through World Government: The Protocols of the Learned Elders of ZionThe earliest imprint in the British Library is as follows:

System number    	 002659964
Author – personal   	NILUS, Sergei Aleksandrovich.
Title   	World Conquest through World Government. The protocols of the Learned Elders of Zion.''
Translated ... by Victor E. Marsden, etc. (Eighty-first impression.).
Publisher/year   	pp. 104. Britons Publishing Society: London, 1958.

References

See also
 Contemporary imprints of The Protocols of the Elders of Zion

 
1905 books
1920 books
Jews and Judaism in the Russian Empire
Lists of books